The Alexander Pushkin Joint Turkmen-Russian Secondary School is a secondary international school in Ashgabat, the capital of Turkmenistan. The school is operated by the Ministry of Education and Science of Russia and the Ministry of Education of Turkmenistan. It was founded in 2002.

History
In 1997, a school was opened in Ashgabat for the children of Russian border officers serving in Turkmenistan. 2 years later, in 1999, the school was closed following the expiration of the agreement that established the school. In the years following the school's closure, there was serious debate in the Russian Government over what the education of the children of Russian diplomats in Ashgabat. As a result, the school was reestablished on January 21, 2002 following the signing of an agreement between the Turkmen and Russian governments the year before.

On May 29 of that same year, the official academic year of the school began. In December 2009, the President of Turkmenistan Gurbanguly Berdimuhamedov and the President of Russia Dmitry Medvedev took part in the opening of a new 10-story building of the school.

References

External links
  Official Website

Russia–Turkmenistan relations
Ashgabat
Educational institutions established in 2002
2002 establishments in Turkmenistan